Jean Blanc (3 December 1918 – 15 November 1999) was a French racing cyclist. He rode in the 1949 Tour de France.

References

External links

1918 births
1999 deaths
French male cyclists
Sportspeople from Puy-de-Dôme